Butcher's Crossing is a 2022 American Western drama film directed by Gabe Polsky and starring Nicolas Cage. It is Polsky's narrative feature film debut. It is based on the 1960 novel of the same name by John Edward Williams.

It had its world premiere at the 2022 Toronto International Film Festival on September 9, 2022.

Cast
Nicolas Cage as Miller
 Fred Hechinger as Will Andrews
Jeremy Bobb
Xander Berkeley
Rachel Keller as Francine
Paul Raci

Production
In September 2021, it was announced that Saban Films acquired US distribution rights to the film, with Altitude distributing internationally.

Filming began in Montana in October 2021.

Release
It had its world premiere at the 2022 Toronto International Film Festival on September 9, 2022.

Reception

Critical response

References

External links
 

2022 films
American Western (genre) films
Films based on American novels
Films shot in Montana
Saban Films films
2020s English-language films
Films directed by Gabe Polsky
2020s American films
2022 Western (genre) films